Rhinoplasty is an extended play record by Primus. It was released August 11, 1998 by Interscope Records and features covers of songs by artists such as Stanley Clarke,  Metallica, and Jerry Reed. The CD also features an interactive CD-ROM which includes the claymation video for "The Devil Went Down to Georgia". The 2018 vinyl reissue includes "The Devil Went Down to Georgia" as the eighth track.

The live version of "Tommy the Cat" is performed with "The Awakening" in the middle. The original song was by The Reddings from their 1980 album The Awakening, and had previously been covered by Les Claypool and the Holy Mackerel on their album Highball with the Devil.

Cover art
The cover art features a clay figure sculpted by Claypool, along with Japanese katakana characters to the far right, reading out "ネセソトナニツキノハ", or "Nesesotonanitsukinoha".

Critical reception

In his review for Allmusic, Stephen Thomas Erlewine describes the EP as "another small treasure for fans." He notes that "the band hasn't chosen any surprising covers" but "makes up for it with great performances" and "startling arrangements that are often unpredictable", concluding that "it doesn't disappoint." For Pitchfork Media, Susan Moll notes that "while Brian  "Brain" Mantia's heavy-hitting drums were the focus of The Brown Album, Rhinoplasty marks a return to the vintage Primus sound, with Claypool's bass front and center, where it belongs." She also opines that "the band's version of "Making Plans For Nigel" (from Miscellaneous Debris) is legendary, but their take on "Scissor Man" is more deranged than Andy Partridge on a bad day."

Track listing

Charts

References

Primus (band) EPs
1998 EPs
Interscope Records EPs
Prawn Song Records EPs
Covers EPs